Old Longueuil is a historic neighbourhood located in the borough of the same name, in the city of Longueuil, Quebec, Canada. There is not a universal definition of what exactly constitute the Old Longueuil neighbourhood, but it always includes at least the territory corresponding to the pre-1961 city of Longueuil.

Old Longueuil was named a heritage district by the city in 1993, and features 450 buildings built before 1945. Many historic buildings are found in this district, such as the Co-Cathedral of Saint-Antoine-de-Padoue, the ruins of Fort Longueuil, and Saint Mark's Anglican Church. Rue Saint-Charles, one block inland from the Saint Lawrence River, is the main street in this neighbourhood and features many small businesses, among them restaurants, bars, and corner stores. The borough hall of Le Vieux-Longueuil borough is also in the neighbourhood.

Location

References

External links
Walking tour of Old Longueuil
Map showing location of original city of Longueuil

Neighbourhoods in Longueuil
Heritage sites in Quebec (Cultural Heritage Act)